George Adu-Mensah born (20 December 1957) is a Ghanaian politician and a member of the first Parliament of the fourth Republic representing the Odotobri constituency in the Ashanti region.

Early life and education
Adu-Mensah was born on 20 December 1957 at Odotobri in the Ashanti Region of Ghana. He graduated at the University of Ghana and obtained his Bachelor of Science degree after he studied agriculture.

Politics
Adu-Mensah was first elected into parliament on the ticket of the  National Democratic Congress during the December 1992 Ghanaian parliamentary election for the Odotobri Constituency in the Ashanti Region of Ghana. He was defeated by Samuel Nkrumah Gyimah of the New Patriotic Party during the 1996 Ghanaian general elections who polled 70% out of the 100% valid votes cast whilst Adu-Mensah polled 30% out of the 100% valid votes cast. He served for one term as a member of parliament. Following his defeat to Gyimah in the 1996 general election, he was appointed the District Chief Executive of the Adansi West District (now a part of the Obuasi Municipal District). He served in this capacity from 1997 to 2001 when the New Patriotic Party took office as the political party in power.

Career
Adu-Mensah is an Agriculturalist by profession and a former Deputy Ashanti Regional Minister in-charge of Agriculture. He also is the former member for parliament for the Odotobri constituency in the Ashanti Region. He is a Trader as well.

Personal life
Adu-Mensah is a Christian.

References

1957 births
Living people
University of Ghana alumni
National Democratic Congress (Ghana) politicians
Ghanaian MPs 1993–1997
Ghanaian Christians
Agriculturalists
21st-century Ghanaian politicians
People from Ashanti Region